Kim Jin-sun (born 27 April 1979) is a South Korean handball player. She competed in the women's tournament at the 2000 Summer Olympics.

References

1979 births
Living people
South Korean female handball players
Olympic handball players of South Korea
Handball players at the 2000 Summer Olympics
Place of birth missing (living people)